Asura obliquilinea is a moth of the family Erebidae first described by Charles Swinhoe in 1901. It is found in India.

References

obliquilinea
Moths described in 1901
Moths of Asia